Gothic House is a Gothic-style building in the centre of Brighton, England.

Gothic House may also refer to:

Gothic House (Bad Homburg), Bad Homburg, Hesse-Homburg, Germany
Gothic House (Puławy), Puławy, Poland
Gothic House, Brighton, West Sussex, United Kingdom
The Gothic House, Portland, Maine, United States

See also
 American Gothic House or Dibble House, a house in Eldon, Iowa, United States